Too Late to Turn Back may refer to:

Too Late to Turn Back Now (album), a 1977 album by New Grass Revival
"Too Late to Turn Back Now" (song), a 1972 song by Cornelius Brothers & Sister Rose